Margaret Grant is an Irish boccia player. She won a gold medal at the 2000 Summer Paralympics with John Cronin in the Mixed pairs BC3 boccia event.

References

Living people
Boccia players
Medalists at the 2000 Summer Paralympics
Boccia players at the 2000 Summer Paralympics
Paralympic boccia players of Ireland
Paralympic medalists in boccia
Paralympic gold medalists for Ireland
Year of birth missing (living people)